Union of Lithuanian Freedom Fighters or Movement for the Struggle for Lithuanian Freedom ( or LLKS) was a resistance organization of the Lithuanian partisans, waging a guerrilla war against the Soviet Union in the aftermath of World War II. The organization was established on February 10, 1949, during a meeting of all partisan commanders in Minaičiai village. Jonas Žemaitis (codename Vytautas) was elected as the chairman of its presidium. On February 16, the 31st anniversary of the 1918 Act of Independence of Lithuania, the Union adopted a declaration proclaiming itself to be the supreme political and military authority in Lithuania. In 1996, after Lithuania regained independence in 1990, the Seimas (parliament) recognized the declaration as an official act of the Republic of Lithuania and Žemaitis as President of Lithuania. The organization and the partisan war were suppressed by the Soviet security agencies by 1953.

Structure

References

Sources

External links
 English translation of the Declaration of February 16, 1949

Military units and formations established in 1949
Organizations disestablished in 1953
Paramilitary organizations based in Lithuania
Lithuanian Soviet Socialist Republic
1949 establishments in the Soviet Union
1953 disestablishments in the Soviet Union